This is a list of player transfers involving SuperLiga teams leading up to the 2015 season.

Baia Mare

Players In
 Taniela Rawaqa from  Fiji Warriors
 Tim Buchanan from  San Francisco Golden Gate RFC
 Nigel Genia from  Queensland Reds A
 Adrian Apostol from  Farul Constanta
 Dumani Mtya from  CSM București
 John Leiataua from  Westcombe Park
 Keegan Shefton from  Souths Rugby
 Ionut Stan from  Rugby Botticino
 Catalin Pastrama from  Farul Constanta
 Sioeli Nau from  Up Country Lions
 Daniel Cubas from  Dinamo București (back from loan)

Players Out
 Daniel Brooks to  Bristol Rugby
 Stephen Hihetah to  Doncaster Knights
 Minya Csaba Gál to  U Cluj
 Shane Spring to  Old Selbornians
 Sione Vaiomo'unga retired
 Georgel Catuna retired
 Samisoni Taufa released

CSM București

Players In
 Andrew Suniula from  Wasps
 Florin Vlaicu from  Farul Constanta
 Daniel Carpo from  Timișoara Saracens
 Sosefo Sakalia from  Steaua București
 Mateo Malupo from  Timișoara Saracens
 Alex Gordaș from  Worcester Warriors
 Petru Tamba from  Farul Constanta
 Siale Fahiua from  Toa ko Ma’afu
 Junior Taavili from  Randwick DRUFC
 Vlad Badalicescu from  Farul Constanta
 Nicolae Nere from  Farul Constanta
 Silviu Vasiliu from  U Cluj
 Alfred Paea from  Randwick DRUFC
 Atelea Okati from  Penrith Emus Rugby
 Heroshi Tea from  West Coast RFC
 Onal Agiacai from  Farul Constanta
 Phillip Tuigamala from  Manurewa Marlins
 Andrei Romanov from  Krasny Yar
 Kamil Sobota from  U Cluj

Players Out
 Otar Turashvili to  US Colomiers
 Marius Antonescu to  Tarbes Pyrénées Rugby
 Jonetani Ralulu to  Chambéry
 Keith Masima to  La Voulte-Valence
 Dumani Mtya to  Baia Mare
 Andrei Filip to  Steaua București
 Tudorel Bratu to   Dinamo București 
 Silviu Budileanu to   Dinamo București 
 Cristian Onofrei to   Dinamo București 
 Andrei Florescu to  Steaua București
 Willie Tooala to  Bédarrides
 Dylan Takato-Simpson to  Souths Rugby
 Sam Zlatevski retired
 Thabiso Mngomezulu released
 Nicolae Barbu released
 Bogdan Petreanu released
 Alberto Tutunea released
 Petre Zapan released

U Cluj

Players In
 Bogdan Balan from  Lyon OU
 Minya Csaba Gál from  Baia Mare
 Mohamed Belguidoum from  SC Albi
 Renaud Van Neel from  Farul Constanta
 Levan Genebashvili from  RC Locomotive Tbilisi
 Taniela Halafihi from  
 Vlad Toma from  Stiinta Petrosani

Players Out
 Silviu Vasiliu to   CSM București
 Kamil Sobota to   CSM București
 Eduard Ciaparii to  Timișoara Saracens
 Samuel Cira to  Timișoara Saracens
 Bogdan Ionescu retired

Dinamo București

Players In
 Eugene Jantjies from  Farul Constanta
 Tevita Iketau from  Nedlands Rugby
 Silviu Budileanu from    CSM București
 Cristian Onofrei from  CSM București
 Andrei Florescu from  CSM București
 Dragos Doru from  Steaua București

Players Out
 Vlad Tanase to   Steaua București
 Marian Arion to   Steaua București
 Daniel Cubas to  Baia Mare back from loan
 Roman Rotundu to   Sporting-ASEM
 Daniel Vajea to   CSM București U23
 Andrei Borz to   Stiinta Petrosani
 Alexandru Dumbrava released
 Marius Lacatusu released
 Cosmin Stan released

Steaua București

Players In
 Malakai Ravulo from   Farul Constanta
 Nemia Kenatale from   Farul Constanta
 Robert Neagu from   Farul Constanta
 Andrei Filip from  Saint-Jean-d'Angély
 Sabin Stratila from   Farul Constanta
 Eseria Vueti from   Farul Constanta
 Vainanuma Manu from  Marist
 Petre Neacsu from   Farul Constanta
 Vali-Catalin Mototolea from   Farul Constanta
 Niko Moa from  Marist
 Vlad Tanase from   Dinamo București
 Bogdan Doroftei from  RC Barlad
 Petru Toma from  CSS 2 Siromex

Players Out
 Sosefo Sakalia to  CSM București
 Daniel Ianus to  Timișoara Saracens
 Bogdan Neacsu to  Timișoara Saracens
 Constantin Dumitru to  CSM București U23
 Viorel Zamfir to  Farul Constanta
 Sione Nau released
 Cristian Moisei released
 Adrian Udroiu released
 Adrian Dima released

Timișoara Saracens

Players In
 Andrei Rădoi from  Ealing Trailfinders
 Tom Cox from  Brumbies
 Brian Sefanaia from  North Harbour Rays
 Daniel Ianus from  Steaua București
 Tevita Manumua from  Saracens F.C.
 Hayden O'Donnell from  Marist Albion Christchurch
 Bogdan Neacsu from  Steaua București
 Eduard Ciaparii from  U Cluj
 Samuel Cira from  U Cluj
 Dimitrije Avramovic from  Rugby Club Partizan
 Vladut Zaharia from  RC Barlad
 Catalin Vladeanu free

Players Out
 Catalin Fercu to  Saracens F.C.
 Andrei Mahu to  Zebre Rugby
 Daniel Carpo to  CSM București
 Mateo Malupo to  CSM București
 Cristi Cornei to  Steaua București

See also
List of 2015–16 Premiership Rugby transfers
List of 2015–16 RFU Championship transfers
List of 2015–16 Pro12 transfers
List of 2015–16 Top 14 transfers
List of 2015–16 Super Rugby transfers

References

2015–16 in Romanian rugby union
Lists of rugby union transfers